The 1988–89 Football League season was Birmingham City Football Club's 86th in the Football League and their 26th in the Second Division. They finished in 23rd position in the division, expanded for this season to 24 teams as part of a restructuring process, so were relegated to the Third Division for the first time in the club's history. They entered the 1988–89 FA Cup in the third round proper and lost to Wimbledon in that round, were eliminated at the second-round stage of the League Cup by local rivals Aston Villa 7–0 over two legs, and lost in the first round of the Full Members' Cup, again to Aston Villa, this time by six goals to nil.

The top scorers in league matches were Steve Whitton and Colin Robinson with five goals apiece; Whitton scored six, if goals scored in all competitions are counted. The average attendance, of 6,289, was the lowest ever at St Andrew's.

In April 1989, Ken Wheldon sold the club to the Kumar brothers, owners of a Manchester-based fashion and leisurewear company. Dave Mackay was brought in as general manager, previous manager Garry Pendrey refused to stay on as part of Mackay's staff, and Wheldon retained a seat on the board while Samesh Kumar became chairman.

Football League Second Division

League table (part)

FA Cup

League Cup

Full Members' Cup

Appearances and goals

Numbers in parentheses denote appearances as substitute.
Players with name struck through and marked  left the club during the playing season.
Players with names in italics and marked * were on loan from another club for the whole of their season with Birmingham.

See also
Birmingham City F.C. seasons

References
General
 
 
 Source for match dates, league positions and results: 
 Source for lineups, appearances, goalscorers and attendances: Matthews (2010), Complete Record, pp. 412–13, 480.

Specific

Birmingham City F.C. seasons
Birmingham City